The 1980 Murjani WTA Championships was a women's tennis tournament played on outdoor clay courts at the Amelia Island Plantation on Amelia Island, Florida in the United States that was part of the 1980 WTA Tour. It was the inaugural edition of the tournament and was held from April 15 through April 20, 1980. First-seeded Martina Navratilova won the singles title and earned $20,000 first-prize money.

Finals

Singles
 Martina Navratilova defeated  Hana Mandlíková 5–7, 6–3, 6–2
 It was Navratilova's 7th singles title of the year and the 41st of her career.

Doubles
 Rosemary Casals /  Ilana Kloss defeated  Kathy Jordan /  Pam Shriver 7–6(7–5), 7–6(7–3)
 It was Casals' 4th doubles title of the year and the 112th of her career. It was Kloss' 4th doubles title of the year and the 23rd of her career.

References

External links
 ITF tournament edition details

Amelia Island Championships
1980 WTA Tour
Murjani WTA Championships
Murjani WTA Championships
Murjani WTA Championships